Hermann Maria Ölberg (14 October 1922 – 25 February 2017) was an Austrian linguist and Albanologist.

Biography 
In 2005, the University of Tirana awarded Ölberg the title of Doctor honoris causa.

Ölberg died on 25 February 2017 in Innsbruck, Austria, at the age of 94.

References 

1922 births
2017 deaths
Albanologists
Austrian academics
Place of birth missing